Puntal dels Escambrons is a mountain of Catalonia, Spain.

Geography
With an elevation of 500 metres above sea level the Puntal dels Escambrons is the highest hill of the Segrià comarca. It is located in the Almatret, Segrià, and Riba-roja d'Ebre, Ribera d'Ebre, municipal limits. 

A wind farm, the Parc Eòlic Els Escambrons is being built on this mountain and neighboring ridges.

See also
Mountains of Catalonia

References

External links
 Map Segrià, ICC 1:50.000
Wikiloc - Puntal dels Escambrons hiking route
 Puntal dels Escambrons (500 m)

Mountains of Catalonia
Segrià